The 1970 Memorial Cup was the 52nd annual Memorial Cup competition, organized by the Canadian Amateur Hockey Association (CAHA) to determine the champion of junior A ice hockey.  It was a best-of-seven series between the Montreal Jr. Canadiens of the Ontario Hockey Association and the Weyburn Red Wings of the Saskatchewan Junior Hockey League held at the Montreal Forum in Montreal, Quebec.  Montreal won their third Memorial Cup, defeating Weyburn four games to none.

Scores
Game 1: Montreal 9-4 Weyburn
Game 2: Montreal 6-2 Weyburn
Game 3: Montreal 5-4 Weyburn
Game 4: Montreal 6-5 Weyburn

Winning roster

National Playoff Tree

Additional Interleague Playdowns
Charlottetown Islanders defeated Fredericton Chevies 3-games-to-1

Roll of League Champions
BCJHL: Vernon Essos
AJHL: Red Deer Rustlers
SJHL: Weyburn Red Wings
MJHL: Dauphin Kings
TBJHL: Fort William Westfort Hurricanes
NOJHA: Sault Ste. Marie Greyhounds
OHA: Montreal Junior Canadiens
CJHL: Ottawa M&W Rangers
LHJQ: Quebec Remparts
LHJSLS: Port Alfred Nationale
New Brunswick: Fredericton Chevies
MarJHL: Charlottetown Islanders

References

External links
 Memorial Cup 
 Canadian Hockey League

Mem
Memorial Cup tournaments
Ice hockey competitions in Montreal